Dina Thorslund (born 14 October 1993) is a Danish professional boxer. She is a world champion in two weight classes, having held the WBO female super-bantamweight title since 2018 and the WBO female bantamweight title since June 2021. At regional level, she held the European female super-bantamweight title in 2017. As of June 2021, she is ranked as the world's best active female bantamweight by BoxRec and the fifth best active female super-bantamweight by The Ring.

Professional career
Thorslund made her professional debut against Czech Petra Podráská on 28 February 2015 at the Boxsporthalle Braamkamp in Hamburg. Thorslund won the fight via first-round technical knockout (TKO).

On 10 March 2018, she defeated Alicia Ashley for the WBC interim female super-bantamweight title in Struer, Denmark, winning by unanimous decision (UD).

Thorslund won the WBO female super-bantamweight title, defeating Mexican Jessica Arreguín by UD on 25 August 2018 at the Struer Arena.

On 19 January 2019, Thorslund made her first defense of the WBO title against Alesia Graf, winning by UD.

Professional boxing record

See also

References

1993 births
Super-bantamweight boxers
Sportspeople from Copenhagen
World Boxing Council champions
World Boxing Organization champions
Living people
Danish women boxers